Ready 2 Rumble Boxing: Round 2 is a boxing game for the Dreamcast, Nintendo 64, PlayStation, PlayStation 2 (a North American launch title for the system), and Game Boy Advance. It is also the sequel to Ready 2 Rumble Boxing.

Gameplay
Gameplay in the game is similar to that of the previous game. The more big hits the player land consecutively, letters that spell out "RUMBLE" appear below the player's side of the screen. Letters also appear when the fighter taunts his opponent. Once the word is formed, powerful combo attacks can be activated that will almost definitely knock the opponent down. This time, however, there are three levels of "RUMBLE", which build up one after the other. If the player successfully lands a combo with his RUMBLE Meter full on the third level (where the letters start smoking), the final blow can launch the opponent clear out of the ring, giving the player an instant victory.

Development 
News from Midway's sequel to Ready 2 Rumble Boxing were first made public back in early summer of 1999 and in May 2000, showed off the game at that year's E3 for demonstration. It was here that Midway announced that the game would receive a PlayStation 2 release. In September 2000 the game was previewed for public demonstrating at that year's ECTS. That same month images and screenshots of two of the game's unlockable characters were unveiled: Shaquille O'Neal and Michael Jackson. It was stated that Jackson was motion captured and digitally photographed for his character, and also lent his own voice to his character, albeit at a lower register than his usual speaking voice. Midway released the PlayStation 2 version on October 23 to coincide with the release of the PlayStation 2. As with the previous game, ring announcer Michael Buffer appears in the game as himself. The game's roster also features then U.S. President Bill Clinton and his wife Hillary Clinton, credited respectively only as "Mr. President" and "The First Lady".

Due to hardware restrictions, several characters had to be cut from the Nintendo 64 version, namely Freak E. Deke, Wild "Stubby" Corley, Freedom Brock, G.C. Thunder, Robox Rese-4 and Rumbleman.

Reception

The game received "mixed or average reviews" on all platforms except the PlayStation 2 version, which received "generally favorable reviews", according to the review aggregation website Metacritic.  Greg Orlando of NextGen said in its February 2001 issue that the same PS2 version "fills its spit bucket with last year's saliva." Five issues later, however, the magazine said that the Game Boy Advance version was "still in the ring, but it's out on its feet." In Japan, Famitsu gave the former console version a score of 31 out of 40.

Alan Maddrell of N64 Magazine gave the Nintendo 64 version a score of 76% and said that "we still have the same problems with the game as we had about a year ago. Sluggish response, annoying collision detection and the overriding averageness of it all. Shame." Edge gave the Dreamcast version a score of seven out of ten and called it "an offbeat, unpretentious treat." Jon Thompson of AllGame gave the same Dreamcast version three stars out of five and said it was "definitely a fighter for people who don't need deep gameplay to have a great time. It looks polished and is extremely easy to pick up and play, and something should be said for such a game. However, if you want a fighter with a bit more teeth to it, this title probably isn't for you." However, J.C. Barnes gave the PlayStation version three-and-a-half stars out of five, saying, "Those who bought the previous Ready 2 Rumble and are expecting a completely new experience will be sorely disappointed -- it's simply a basic roster update for the original. Yet gamers who haven't had a chance to play the first game will want to at least rent the sequel for some mindless but fun arcade-style action." Shawn Nicholls later gave the Game Boy Color version three-and-a-half stars and called it "an easy game to enjoy. While it isn't as challenging as more traditional sports titles, it is entertaining and the length of the Championship mode alone makes it a solid investment for any Game Boy Advance owner."

Da bomb mom of GameZone gave the PlayStation 2 version a perfect ten score and said that it was "one of those rare cases where it crosses so many lines of game genres. Whether you are a sports fan or challenge and skill, this is one game that will deliver on all fronts." Later, however, Michael Lafferty gave the Game Boy Color version 7.5 out of 10 and said that it was "more reflexive than cerebral, but still a lot of fun."

The PlayStation 2 version was a finalist for the "Console Fighting Game of the Year" award at the Academy of Interactive Arts & Sciences' 4th Annual Interactive Achievement Awards, which went to Dead or Alive 2.

Notes

References

External links

2000 video games
Boxing video games
Dreamcast games
Game Boy Advance games
Michael Jackson-related games
Midway video games
Video games based on musicians
Nintendo 64 games
PlayStation (console) games
PlayStation 2 games
Video game sequels
Video games developed in the United States
Multiplayer and single-player video games
Crawfish Interactive games
Video games based on real people
Cultural depictions of Bill Clinton
Cultural depictions of Hillary Clinton
Cultural depictions of basketball players
Shaquille O'Neal
Video games featuring black protagonists